The Criminal Justice Act 2003 applicable in England and Wales, and to a lesser extent Scotland and Northern Ireland, implemented fundamental changes to the admissibility of evidence relating to character, in respect to defendants and others. The Act is far-reaching, providing for the admissibility of previous convictions in support of a propensity to commit like-offences and untruthfulness. Common law rules in relation to the admissibility of bad character evidence have been abolished, with the existence of one exception.

The legislation draws heavily on the Law Commission Paper No. 273, with some deviations resulting from the Parliamentary debates as the Bill moved through Parliament.

Definition
Bad character evidence is evidence of, or a disposition towards misconduct; other than evidence which has to do with the alleged facts of the offense with which the defendant is charged or is evidence of misconduct in connection with the investigation or prosecution of that offence.  Misconduct is defined as "the commission of an offence or other reprehensible behaviour". 
Bad character in relation to the alleged facts offense itself has always been admissible for obvious reasons. The Act provides for different rules in relation to the bad character of defendants, and that of non-defendants. In assessing the probative value of evidence it is assumed to be true, unless there is material to suggest the contrary.

Apart from evidence of previous convictions, other evidence, amounting to "reprehensible behaviour" is admissible. The Government stated the following during debate:
"Examples of where it might be appropriate to admit such evidence include circumstances where evidence on a number of charges being tried concurrently is cross-admissible in respect of the other charges.
It might also be appropriate to admit evidence relating to charges on which the defendant was acquitted, as I have already cited in the example of. It would be unfortunate if an argument were to be accepted that, because a person has not actually been convicted of the offense, it cannot be said that the evidence shows that he has indeed committed such an offense and it is therefore excluded".

Statutory Gateways 
The Criminal Justice Act 2003 provides for seven statutory gateways. Evidence of a defendant's bad character is admissible on if -

 all parties to the proceedings agree to the evidence being admissible,
 the evidence is adduced by the defendant himself or is given in answer to a question asked by him in cross-examination and intended to elicit it,
 it is important explanatory evidence,
 it is relevant to an important matter in issue between the defendant and the prosecution,
 it has substantial probative value in relation to an important matter in issue between the defendant and a co-defendant,
 it is evidence to correct a false impression given by the defendant, or
 the defendant has made an attack on another person’s character.

Exclusion of bad character evidence
The Criminal Justice Act does provide a specific provision for the exclusion of bad character evidence, where it may be excluded if it appears to the court that the admission of the evidence would have such an adverse effect on the fairness of the proceedings that the court ought not to admit it. Essentially, bad character evidence may be excluded on the grounds of unfairness. 

The language of the Criminal Justice Act mirrors that of section 78 PACE 1984, with the difference of PACE stating that courts 'may' exclude evidence where its admission would be unfair, whilst the Criminal Justice Act states courts 'must' exclude such evidence. This may provide stronger protections for defendants where the language of the statute is imperative.

In addition to the statutory tests for exclusion of bad character evidence the power to exclude evidence under section 78 PACE 1984 Police and Criminal Evidence Act 1984 is not affected by the Criminal Justice Act 2003 provisions (House of Lords, Hansard, 19 November 2003, Col. 1988).  Both provisions exist alongside one another.

Criticisms 
Academic commentators have criticized the use of the phrase "reprehensible behavior" in section 112 of the Criminal Justice Act 2003. This language has not featured in any UK statute law before, and as such its interpretation has led to some inconsistent case law, where courts are subjectively interpreting whether evidence qualifies as "reprehensible behavior" without clear precedent.

This language was introduced into the Act as it progressed through Parliament, with the original Law Commission Paper instead proposing that a reasonable person test, commonly featured in law in England and Wales, be used.

Notes and references

External links
Hansard 15 Sept 2003: Column 716
put character in issue 15 Aug 2009 : Putting the bad character of a co-defendant in issue

Evidence law
English criminal law